Manuel Eduardo Tenchi Ugaz Nemotto (born June 21, 1981), known as Manuel Ugaz or simply Ugaz, is a Peruvian footballer who plays as right back.

Career statistics

References

External links

 at BDFA.com.ar

1981 births
Living people
Peruvian footballers
Association football defenders
Peruvian Primera División players
Peruvian Segunda División players
Deportivo Coopsol players
Club Deportivo Universidad de San Martín de Porres players
Club Deportivo Universidad César Vallejo footballers
Juan Aurich footballers
León de Huánuco footballers
Cienciano footballers
Carlos A. Mannucci players
Real Garcilaso footballers
Deportivo Municipal footballers
Ayacucho FC footballers
Unión Huaral footballers